The 2020–21 NorthEast United FC season was the club's seventh season since its establishment in 2014 and their seventh season in the Indian Super League.

Players 
Current squad of the club:

Transfers

IN

Competitions

Pre-season and friendlies

Indian Super League

League table

Results summary

Results by matchday

Matches

Play-offs

Squad statistics

Appearance and goals

|-
|colspan="12"| Players who left NorthEast United during the season

|}

Goal scorers

Assists

Clean sheets

Disciplinary record

Notes

References

NorthEast United FC seasons
2020–21 Indian Super League season by team